Plasmodium achiotense is a parasite of the genus Plasmodium.

Like all Plasmodium species P. lacertiliae has both vertebrate and insect hosts. The vertebrate hosts for this parasite are reptiles.

Description 

The parasite was first described by Thompson and Hart in 1946.

Geographical occurrence 

This species is found in New Guinea.

Clinical features and host pathology 

Hosts of this species include the crocodile skink (Tribolonotus species) and Leiolopisma fuscum.

References 

lacertiliae